Madriz is a department in Nicaragua. It covers an area of 1,708 km2 and has a population of 176,920 (2021 estimate). The capital is Somoto.

Madriz was created from Nueva Segovia department in August 1936, and named after President José Madriz.

Municipalities 

 Las Sabanas
 Palacagüina
 San José de Cusmapa
 San Juan del Río Coco
 San Lucas
 Somoto
 Telpaneca
 Totogalpa
 Yalagüina

External links

 Portal del Norte de Nicaragua

References 

 
Departments of Nicaragua
States and territories established in 1936
1936 establishments in Nicaragua